Unnecessary Fuss is a film produced by People for the Ethical Treatment of Animals (PETA), showing footage shot inside the University of Pennsylvania's Head Injury Clinic in Philadelphia. The raw footage was recorded by the laboratory researchers as they inflicted brain damage to baboons using a hydraulic device. The experiments were conducted as part of a research project into head injuries such as is caused in vehicle accidents.

Sixty hours of audio and video tapes were stolen from the laboratory on May 28, 1984, by the Animal Liberation Front (ALF), described in their press release as the "Watergate tapes of the animal rights movement". ALF handed the tapes over to PETA. The footage was edited down to 26 minutes by Alex Pacheco and narrated by Ingrid Newkirk, then distributed to the media and Congress. Charles McCarthy, director of the Office for Protection from Research Risks (OPRR), wrote that the film had "grossly overstated the deficiencies in the Head Injury Clinic", but that the OPRR had found serious violations of the Guide for Care and Use of Laboratory Animals. Due to the publicity and the results of several investigations and reports, the lab was closed.

The title of the film comes from a statement made to The Globe and Mail by the head of the clinic, neurosurgeon Thomas Gennarelli, before the raid. He declined to describe his research to the newspaper because, he said, it had "the potential to stir up all sorts of unnecessary fuss."

Contents of the film

The film shows at least one sedated but not anesthetized baboon with his wrists and ankles tied, strapped to table, his head secured with dental stone inside a helmet. A hydraulic device slams the baboon's head, intended to simulate whiplash. After one such injury is sustained, the helmet seems stuck and two researchers use a hammer and screwdriver to dislodge the helmet; a researcher is heard to say "Push!", grunts, then "It's a boy!" as the helmet finally comes loose. One sequence shows that a baboon's ear has been damaged as the helmet is removed: "... like I left a little bit of the ear behind." The footage shows researchers performing electrocautery on an inadequately sedated baboon, smoking cigarettes and pipes during surgery, laughing, and playing loud music. A researcher is seen holding a brain-injured baboon up to the camera, while others speak to the animal: "Don't be shy now, sir, nothing to be afraid of". While one baboon was strapped and waiting in the hydraulic device, the photographer pans to a brain-damaged baboon strapped into a high chair in another corner of the room as he says "Cheerleading in the corner, we have B-10. B-10 wishes his counterpart well. As you can see, B-10 is still alive. B-10 is hoping for a good result".

Distribution, reception, result

The film was distributed to major newspapers and new agencies, as well as Congress. The broad distribution and the piteous images in the film stirred public outrage. Journalist Deborah Blum wrote "It is difficult to put into words just how ugly that brief movie is."

The university's president halted its use of animals in experiments in response to a preliminary report by the National Institutes of Health (NIH).

The Secretary of Health and Human Services, Margaret Heckler, after reading the same preliminary report, and after a four-day sit-in by animal rights activists at NIH, ordered the suspension of the annual $1 million NIH grant supporting the baboon research.

Several investigations and favorable assessments of the research have taken place. The NIH report and a university report were delayed because the activists refused to release the tapes for a year. The university report concurred with the NIH reviewers about the scientific merit of the head injury research, while delineating items where there were violations. It was noted in the report that since the raid and resulting media exposure, many of the concerns had already been addressed within the university. But in the end, the research lab was shut down.

The biomedical research community expressed its concerns that the government capitulating to activists would put other research at risk of attack by direct action.

OPRR investigation
An investigation was conducted by 18 veterinarians from the American College of Laboratory Animal Medicine, commissioned by the Office for Protection from Research Risks (OPRR). Charles R. McCarthy, director of the OPRR at the time, wrote that "[d]espite the fact that Unnecessary Fuss grossly overstated the deficiencies in the Head Injury Clinic, OPRR found many extraordinarily serious violations of the Guide for Care and Use of Laboratory Animals ... Furthermore, OPRR found deficiencies in the procedures for care of animals in many other laboratories operated under the auspices of the university."

The violations included that the depth of anesthetic coma was questionable; that most of the animals were not seen by a veterinarian either before or after surgery; survival surgical techniques were not carried out in the required aseptic manner; that the operating theater was not properly cleaned; and that smoking was allowed in the operating theater despite the presence of oxygen tanks.

When PETA made its 26-minute film available, the OPRR initially refused to investigate because the film had been edited from 60 hours of videotape. For over a year PETA refused to release the original footage. When they eventually handed over the unedited material, the OPRR discovered that the footage of the brain damage being inflicted involved just one baboon out of the 150 who had received the whiplash injuries, but the film had given the impression that the brain-damage scenes involved several animals.

The OPRR also found deficiencies in other laboratories operated by the university. The university's chief veterinarian was fired, new training programs were initiated, and the university was placed on probation, with quarterly progress reports to OPRR required.

Notes

References

External links
 
 

1984 films
1984 documentary films
American documentary films
Documentary films about American politics
Documentary films about animal rights
Anti-modernist films
Animal cruelty incidents
Animal cruelty incidents in film
Animal testing in the United States
Anti-vivisection movement
1980s English-language films
1980s American films